Dudley Cadell Leslie Williams  (190918 March 1985) is a former senior Australian public servant. He was Secretary of the Department of Shipping and Transport between 1957 and 1969.

Life and career
Dudley Williams was born in 1909. He attended Wesley College and Queen's College.

Williams joined a predecessor to the Department of Shipping and Transport in 1943. In 1952, Williams was appointed to the Australian Ship-building Board as deputy chairman.

He was appointed Secretary of the Department of Shipping and Transport in October 1957. He retired from the Commonwealth Public Service in 1969.

Williams married Miss Margaret Crofton "Peg" Harper in Adelaide on Melbourne Cup day in 1966. He had worked together with Peg for nearly 20 years ahead of their engagement. She had been private secretary to three ministers for shipping and transport.

Williams died on 18 March 1985 at the Mercy Private Hospital in East Melbourne.

Awards
Williams was made a Commander of the Order of the British Empire in June 1961.

References

1909 births
1985 deaths
Australian public servants
Australian Commanders of the Order of the British Empire
University of Melbourne alumni
Place of birth missing